Yautepec Zapotec may be:
Any of several Yautepec Zapotec languages
The more divergent San Bartolo Yautepec